This list encompasses the major honours won by and records set by Parma Calcio 1913, their managers and their players, an Italian professional football club currently playing in Serie A and based in Parma, Emilia-Romagna. The player records section includes details of the club's leading goalscorers and those who have made most appearances in first-team competitions. It also records notable achievements by Parma players on the international stage, and the highest transfer fees paid and received by the club and details Parma's achievements in major competitions. Although Parma have never won a domestic league title, they have won three Italian Cups, one Supercoppa Italiana, as well as two UEFA Cups, one European Super Cup and one UEFA Cup Winners' Cup. The club won all eight of these trophies between 1992 and 2002, a period in which it is also achieved its best ever league finish as runners-up in the 1996–97 season.

Statistics accurate as of 28 May 2018

Honours 
Parma have won eight major titles in their history, with all eight coming in the space of ten years between 1992 and 2002. The only two major honours that Parma are yet to win are the Serie A title and the UEFA Champions League, the most prestigious domestic and continental competitions, respectively. Perhaps reflecting this, Parma are one of just four clubs worldwide who have won a major European trophy without having also won a national league title, along with West Ham United, Real Zaragoza and Bayer Leverkusen. The club were also the only side to represent Italy in European competition for every year between 1991 and 2005.

National 
Coppa Italia:
Winners (3): 1991–92, 1998–99, 2001–02
Runners-up (2): 1994–95, 2000–01
Supercoppa Italiana:
Winners (1): 1999
Runners-up (3): 1992, 1995, 2002
Serie A:
Runners-up (1): 1996–97
Serie B:
Runners-up (2): 2008–09, 2017–18

European 
UEFA Cup:
Winners (2): 1994–95, 1998–99
European Super Cup:
Winners (1): 1993
European Cup Winners' Cup:
Winners (1): 1992–93
Runners-up (1): 1993–94

Minor 
Prima Divisione:
Runners-up (1): 1928–29
Seconda Divisione:
Winners (1): 1924–25
Promozione:
Runners-up (1): 1919–20
Serie C:
Winners (4): 1953–54, 1972–73, 1983–84, 1985–86
Runners-up (2): 1942–43, 1978–79, 2016–17
Serie D:
Winners (1): 1969–70, 2015–16
Coppa delle Alpi:
Winners (1): 1960–61

Friendly Tournaments 

Trofeo Ciudad de Zaragoza:
Winners (1): 1998
Runners-up (1): 2000
Trofeo Birra Moretti:
Winners (1): 1999
Orange Trophy:
Winners (2): 2000, 2007
Joan Gamper Trophy:
Runners-up (1): 2001
Ciutat de Barcelona Trophy:
Winners (1): 2003
Trofeo Costa del Sol:
Runners-up (1): 2010

Players 

All current players are in bold.

Appearances 
Antonio Benarrivo heads the all-time appearances list in Serie A and European competitions and is the only player who was at the club for all eight major trophy victories, but Alessandro Lucarelli holds the appearance record for all league competitions, playing through all four categories in the past decade.

 Youngest player:  – Alessandro Melli v. Rimini, 20 April 1986
 Oldest player:  – Alessandro Lucarelli v. Spezia, 18 May 2018

Most appearances

Most league appearances

Most European appearances

Goalscorers 
 Most goals in a season in all competitions: 28 – Hernán Crespo, 1998–99
 Youngest goalscorer: 16 years and 172 days – Alessandro Melli v Sanremese, 1 June 1986
 Most goals in a Serie A season: 23
 Alberto Gilardino, 2003–04
 Alberto Gilardino, 2004–05
 Most goals in a Serie A match: 4
 Marco Di Vaio v Bari, 2000–01
 Alberto Gilardino v Udinese, 2003–04
 Alberto Gilardino v Livorno, 2004–05

Top scorers

Top league scorers

Top European scorers

Top cup scorers

Goalkeepers 
 Longest period of time without conceding in Serie A: 476 minutes
 Cláudio Taffarel from 9 December 1990 to 27 January 1991
 Gianluigi Buffon in 2000–01
 Longest period of time without conceding in Serie A away from home: 319 minutes, Antonio Mirante from 19 January to 16 March 2014

Award winners

Gran Galà del Calcio 
The Gran Galà del Calcio awards are presented in multiple categories to the best performers over the course of a Serie A season. Parma players have won five of these trophies while at the club; only five clubs have won more.

 Serie A Footballer of the Year: 1
 Alberto Gilardino: 2005
 Serie A Italian Footballer of the Year: 1
 Alberto Gilardino: 2005
 Serie A Young Footballer of the Year: 1
 Alberto Gilardino: 2004
 Serie A Goalkeeper of the Year: 2
 Gianluigi Buffon: 1999, 2001

Serie A Awards 
The Serie A Awards are awarded by the Lega Serie A using calculations from Opta Sports and Netco Sports to determine the best players of a particular Serie A season in different positions.

 Best Young Player: 1
 Dejan Kulusevski: 2019–20

Internationals 
 Major senior international competition winners while at the club:
 World Cup: 3 – Alain Boghossian and Lilian Thuram with  France in 1998 and Júnior with  Brazil in 2002
 UEFA European Football Championship: 1 – Lilian Thuram with  France in 2000
 Copa América: 2 – Zé Maria and Márcio Amoroso with  Brazil in 1997
 FIFA Confederations Cup: 1 – Zé Maria with  Brazil in 1997
 Players who have appeared for the Italy while with the club: 30

Antonio Mirante has been called up to the squad, but is yet to play for the national team as a Parma player, while Fabio Cannavaro captained Italy 5 times as a Parma player.

Transfers

Highest transfer fees paid 
Parma's record signing is Hidetoshi Nakata, who signed for the club from Roma in 2001. It remains the highest fee paid for an Asian player in the history of the game.

Highest transfer fees received 
The club's record sale came in the summer of 2000, when current Serie A record goalscorer Hernán Crespo moved to Lazio.

Managerial records 

 Longest-serving manager: 7 years – Nevio Scala, 1989–1996
 Most spells as manager: 3 – Pietro Carmignani, 1985 (as caretaker), 2001–2002 and 2003–2004
 Most trophies: 4 – Nevio Scala, 1989–1996

Team records

Matches 
 First Coppa Italia match: Virtus Bologna 1–0 Parma, First Round, 2 April 1922
 First Serie A match: Parma 1–2 Juventus, 9 September 1990
 First European match: CSKA Sofia 0–0 Parma, UEFA Cup First Round, first leg, 19 September 1991

Record wins 
 Record league win: 12–0 v Carrarese, Serie C, 6 June 1943
 Record away league win: 9–0 v Budrio, Serie C, 21 February 1943
 Record Serie A win: 5–0 v Perugia, Serie A, 25 February 2001
 Record European win: 6–0 v Bordeaux, UEFA Cup Quarter-final, second leg, 16 March 1999

Record defeats 
 Record league defeat:
0–7 v Atalanta, Serie B, 17 January 1932
0–7 v Juventus, Serie A, 9 November 2014
 Record home Serie A defeat:
0–4 v Fiorentina, 26 February 2000
0–4 v Roma, 24 September 2006
0–4 v Juventus, 19 December 2020

High scoring matches 
 Highest scoring Serie A match: 6–4 v Livorno, 1 May 2005

Runs 
 Longest winning run in league: 8 matches, 31 May to 25 October 1953
 Longest winning run in Serie A: 7 matches, 11 April to 14 May 2012
 Longest unbeaten run in league: 41 matches, 24 May 2015 to 11 September 2016 
 Longest unbeaten run in Serie A: 17 matches, 10 November 2013 to 23 March 2014
 Longest winning run away from home in Serie A: 5 matches, 11 January to 16 March 2014
 Longest run without victory in league: 10 matches, 4 November 2006 to 13 January 2007

Wins/draws/losses in a season 
 Most wins in a league season: 28, 2015–16
 Most home wins in a league season: 15, 1951–52
 Most away wins in a league season: 15, 2015–16
 Most wins in a Serie A season: 18, 1994–95, 1996–97
 Most defeats in a Serie A season: 24, 2014–15
 Fewest wins in a Serie A season: 6, 2014–15
 Fewest defeats in a Serie A season: 7, 1991–92, 1994–95, 1996–97 and 1997–98

Goals 
 Most goals in a league season: 89, 1941–42
 Most goals scored in a Serie A season: 58, 2013–14
 Most goals conceded in a Serie A season: 75, 2014–15
 Fewest goals scored in a Serie A season: 32, 1991–92
 Fewest goals conceded in a Serie A season: 25, 1996–97
 Most individual scorers in a Serie A season: 17, 2011–12

Points 
 Most points in a league season: 94, 2015–16
 Most points in a Serie A season: 63, 1994–95 and 1996–97
 Fewest points in a Serie A season: 26, 2014–15

Club awards 
 World Team of the Year: 24% of the vote, 1993.

Season-by-season performance

See also 
 Italian football club records & statistics

Footnotes

References 

Statistics and records
Parma